Bieberehren is a municipality in the district of Würzburg in Bavaria, Germany. It lies on the river Tauber.

References

Würzburg (district)